Aurora do Tocantins is a municipality located in the Brazilian state of Tocantins. Its population is 3,783 (2020) and its area is 753 km².

Twin towns
 Descartes, France

References

Municipalities in Tocantins